"The Battle" is a song by American country music artist George Jones.  It was composed by Norro Wilson, George Richey, and Linda Kimball and became the title track of Jones' 1976 LP.  The song uses war as a metaphor in describing an argument and eventual reconciliation between a couple, with the woman emerging victorious and the narrator exclaiming, "Oh, what a sweet surrender!"  The song begins with the sound of drums mimicking the start of a battle march.  Despite Billy Sherrill's ambitious production and Jones' committed vocal performance, the single did not crack the Top 10, stalling at #16 and continued the singer's commercial slide as a solo artist.  Meanwhile, the single "Golden Ring," a duet with his estranged ex-wife Tammy Wynette, became a #1 hit that same year.

Chart performance

References

1976 songs
George Jones songs
Songs written by Norro Wilson
Songs written by George Richey
Song recordings produced by Billy Sherrill
Epic Records singles